"Hitsville U.S.A." is the nickname given to Motown's first headquarters and recording studio. The house (formerly a photographers' studio) is located at 2648 West Grand Boulevard in Detroit, Michigan, near the New Center area. The house was purchased by Motown founder Berry Gordy in 1959.

After purchasing the house, Gordy converted it for use as the record label's administrative building and recording studio. Following mainstream success in the mid 1960s through mid 1970s, Gordy moved the label to Los Angeles and established the Hitsville West studio there, as a part of his focus on television and film production as well as music production.

Today, the “Hitsville U.S.A” property operates as the Motown Museum, which is dedicated to the legacy of the record label, its artists, and its music. The museum occupies the original house and an adjacent former residence.

West Grand Boulevard

In 1959, Gordy formed his first label, Tamla Records, and purchased the property that would become Motown's Hitsville U.S.A. studio. The photography studio located in the back of the property was modified into a small recording studio, which was open 22 hours a day (closing from 8 a.m. to 10 a.m. for maintenance), and the Gordys moved into the second-floor living quarters. Within seven years, Motown would occupy seven additional neighboring houses:
 Hitsville U.S.A., 1959: (ground floor) administrative office, tape library, control room, Studio A; (upper floor) Gordy living quarters (1959–1962), artists and repertoire (1962–1972)
 Jobete Publishing office, 1961: sales, billing, collections, shipping, and public relations
 Berry Gordy Jr. Enterprises, 1962: offices for Berry Gordy, Jr. and his sister Esther Gordy Edwards
 Finance department, 1965: royalties and payroll
 Artist personal development, 1966: Harvey Fuqua (head of artist development and producer of stage performances), Maxine Powell (instructor in grooming, poise, and social graces for Motown artists), Maurice King (vocal coach, musical director and arranger), Cholly Atkins (house choreography), and rehearsal studios
 Two houses for administrative offices, 1966: sales and marketing, traveling and traffic, and mixing and mastering
 ITMI (International Talent Management Inc.) office, 1966: management

By the end of 1966, Motown had hired over 450 employees and had a gross income of $20 million.

Expansion and relocation
In 1967, Berry Gordy purchased what is now known as the Motown mansion, in Detroit's Boston-Edison Historic District, as his home, leaving his previous home to his sister Anna and her then-husband, Marvin Gaye (photos for the cover of his album What's Going On were taken there). In 1968, Gordy purchased the Donovan building, on the corner of Woodward Avenue and Interstate 75, and moved Motown's Detroit offices there (the Donovan building was demolished in January 2006 to provide parking spaces for Super Bowl XL). In the same year Gordy purchased Golden World Records, and its recording studio became Motown's Studio B.

In 1972, Gordy relocated the Motown Records headquarters to Los Angeles. The original Hitsville studios, which had produced a long string of worldwide hits, is now the Motown Museum. The following year, he reorganized the company into Motown Industries, an entertainment conglomerate that would include record, movie, television and publishing divisions. Many Motown fans believed the company's heart and soul were lost following the move and that its golden age of creativity ended after its 13 years in Detroit. Esther Gordy Edwards refused to move to California and was put in charge of what was left of Motown's Detroit office in the Hitsville building.

Motown Museum

Edwards received several requests for the Hitsville building to receive visitors. She and her secretary put up posters and gold records. She also carefully preserved Studio A. Since 1985, the Hitsville U.S.A. building has been the site of the Motown Museum, dedicated to the legacy of the record label, its artists, and its music. On October 23, 1988, Michael Jackson donated a black fedora and studded white right-hand glove, along with $125,000, the net proceeds of the first show of his Bad World Tour on October 24 in The Palace of Auburn Hills, to the Motown Museum. Edwards's granddaughter Robin Terry maintains involvement as both board chair and CEO.

Three of the original homes are used by the Motown Museum. Hitsville U.S.A. and the Jobete office are connected for the exhibit, which contains costumes, photos, and records from Motown's success era. Also featured are Motown's Studio A and Berry Gordy's upstairs apartment, decorated to appear as they did during the 1960s. The finance department is currently an administrative office. West Grand Boulevard is named "Berry Gordy, Jr. Boulevard" in the area where the Motown Historical Museum is located. The museum is one of Detroit's most popular tourist destinations.

In October 2016, the museum announced a $50-million-dollar expansion plan in order to create space for interactive exhibits and recording studios. Since the announcement, the museum has received donations from organizations like The Kresge Foundation, the AARP, and the W.K. Kellogg Foundation to help with both the expansion as well as community programming.

Motown's Steinway grand piano

The Motown piano is an 1877 Steinway & Sons Model D grand piano, used by many musicians, including the Funk Brothers studio band, at the Hitsville U.S.A. Studio B from 1967 to 1972. On July 24, 2011, Paul McCartney was in Detroit for a performance at Comerica Park, as part of his On the Run Tour, and visited the Motown Museum for a private guided tour. While touring Studio A, he asked to play the Motown piano, only to find that it was not in playing condition. It was restored in 2012, with the support of McCartney, and was played by McCartney and Berry Gordy during a charity event in September 2012.

The piano was inherited by Motown after it bought Golden World Records in 1967. The Golden World studio then became Hitsville U.S.A. Studio B. The piano is on display in Studio A at the Motown Museum.

Hitsville USA: The Motown Singles Collection
In 1992, Motown released two four-CD boxed sets compiling 104 singles released during its "Detroit era", entitled  Hitsville USA: The Motown Singles Collection 1959–1971 and 76 singles from its "Los Angeles era", Hitsville USA: The Motown Singles Collection Volume Two 1972–1992.

See also
 List of music museums
 Berry Gordy
 Esther Gordy Edwards
 Motown
 Music of Detroit
 The Funk Brothers

References

External links
 
 Motown Museum Expansion
 

Audio engineering
African-American cultural history
Culture of Detroit
Motown
Recording studios in the United States
Museums in Detroit
Music museums in the United States
History museums in Michigan
 
1959 establishments in Michigan